Güzelbeyli is a village in the District of Karacasu, Aydın Province, Turkey. As of 2010 it had a population of 355 people.

References

Villages in Karacasu District